The list of SIAA football champions includes the teams that have won the college football championship of the Southern Intercollegiate Athletic Association since its creation. Twenty-seven of the current Division I FBS (formerly Division I-A) football programs were members of this conference at some point, as were at least 19 other schools. Every member of the current Southeastern Conference except Arkansas and Missouri, as well as six of the 15 current members of the Atlantic Coast Conference plus the University of Texas at Austin, now of the Big 12 Conference (and previously of the now defunct Southwest Conference), formerly held membership in the SIAA.

Champions by year
Championships of the SIAA were not officially awarded by the SIAA itself and were instead more mythical in nature, being a combination of which school(s) were recognized as the consensus champion(s) (by newspapers, coaches, and so forth) and what seasons the schools themselves choose to claim. In the 27 years before 1922, when many schools left the SIAA to form the Southern Conference, Vanderbilt claimed 11 SIAA titles. Auburn and Georgia Tech share second place with 7 SIAA titles each.

1896 to 1921

1922 to 1941

The SIAA continued to exist for another 19 years. In this period the Chattanooga Mocs managed the most titles, coming away with four. At the SIAA annual convention in 1930, nine of the association's members announced the formation of the Dixie Conference to facilitate scheduling of games among the group. The charter members were Birmingham-Southern College, Howard College (now Samford University), Southwestern of Memphis (now Rhodes College), Centre College, University of Chattanooga, Spring Hill College and Mercer University; Loyola University New Orleans joined the Dixie two years later.

At the time of formation, conference president Dean G. W. Meade of Birmingham-Southern stated, "We are still members of the S. I. A. A. and will continue to be so." However, at the SIAA convention the following year, Birmingham-Southern, Howard and Spring Hill resigned from the association.  University officials at Chattanooga announced their resignation from the SIAA in 1932, explaining that they "saw no purpose in remaining in the unwieldy association after successful launching of the Dixie Conference two years ago".

Two years prior to the SIAA, the Dixie Conference approved the use of scholarships in 1936.

References

Books

 

 

Siaa
Champions